Serixia prolata is a species of beetle in the family Cerambycidae. It was described by Francis Polkinghorne Pascoe in 1858.

Subspecies
 Serixia prolata prolata (Pascoe, 1858)
 Serixia prolata insularis Breuning, 1958

References

Serixia
Beetles described in 1858